The 2015–16 Marquette Golden Eagles men's basketball team represented Marquette University in the 2015–16 NCAA Division I men's basketball season. The Golden Eagles, led by second-year head coach Steve Wojciechowski, played their home games at the BMO Harris Bradley Center, and were members of the Big East Conference. They finished the season 20–13, 8–10 in Big East play to finish in seventh place. They defeated St. John's in the first round of the Big East tournament to advance to the quarterfinals where they lost to Xavier. Despite having 20 wins, they did not participate in a postseason tournament.

Previous season 
The Golden Eagles finished the 2014–15 season 13–19, 4–14 in Big East play to finish ninth in the Big East. Marquette defeated Seton Hall before losing to Villanova in the quarterfinals of the Big East tournament. The Golden Eagles finished with a losing conference record for the first time in 15 years, dating back to the 1998–99 season.

Off season

Departures

Incoming Transfers

Incoming recruits

Roster

Schedule

|-
!colspan=9 style="background:#00386D; color:#FDBB30;"| Exhibition

|-
!colspan=9 style="background:#00386D; color:#FDBB30;"| Regular season

|-
!colspan=9 style="background:#00386D; color:#FDBB30;"| Big East tournament

References

Marquette Golden Eagles
Marquette Golden Eagles men's basketball seasons
Marquette
Marquette